Itō may refer to:

Itō (surname), a Japanese surname
Itō, Shizuoka, Shizuoka Prefecture, Japan
Ito District, Wakayama Prefecture, Japan

See also
Itô's lemma, used in stochastic calculus
Itoh–Tsujii inversion algorithm, in field theory
Itô calculus, an extension of calculus to stochastic processes, named after Kiyoshi Itô
Ito (disambiguation)
ITO (disambiguation), for the three-letter acronym

es:Ito
fr:Ito
nl:Ito
ja:いとう
pt:Ito
ru:Ито